Save Your Love may refer to:

 "Save Your Love", song by Kiss from Dynasty (1979)
 "Save Your Love", song by Jefferson Starship from Modern Times (1981)
 "Save Your Love" (Great White song) (1987)
 "Save Your Love" (Rene & Angela song) (1985)
 "Save Your Love" (Renée and Renato song) (1982)
 "Save Your Love" (Tracie Spencer song) (1990)